Dora is an unincorporated community in Coos County, Oregon, United States. It is in the Southern Oregon Coast Range.

Dora post office was established in 1874. The first postmaster was John H. Roach, and, according to Oregon Geographic Names the location may have been named for his daughter, Dora. The office ceased operations in 1939.

At one time Dora had a United Brethren academy, a Grange hall, and a public school.

Dora shares a rural fire protection district with nearby Sitkum.

References

External links

Unincorporated communities in Coos County, Oregon
1874 establishments in Oregon
Populated places established in 1874
Unincorporated communities in Oregon